Kviknes Hotel is a hotel, located by the Sognefjord in Sogndal Municipality in Vestland county, Norway. The hotel has 195 rooms in total which are divided between two buildings.  The historic building was completed in 1913 and has 25 rooms, while the building from the 1960s contains 165 rooms. The hotel is a member of the Norwegian association of historic hotels and restaurants – De historiske.

The historic building in Swiss chalet style was Norway's largest wooden building when it was completed. The building from the 1960s was built in concrete, and the architecture of the wing is characterized by the passage's typical late modernism. In 2008 the new conference and banquet department was finished. "Kviknesalen" has meeting capacity for up to 450 people. The hotel also has several function rooms and lounges, as well as two restaurants and a bar.

Art and culture are central themes at the hotel, including a number of valuable paintings. The hotel also hosts the jazz festival Balejazz.

Nearby the hotel is "The English Church", a beautiful and unique dragestil church that has much common history with the hotel.

Notable visitors 
Over the years, the hotel has been visited by many notable visitors, including:
 Clement Attlee, British Prime Minister
 Ryutaro Hashimoto, Japanese Prime Minister
 Kofi Annan, Secretary-General of the United Nations
 Kirk Douglas, American actor
 Janet Leigh, American actress
 Tony Curtis, American actor

Emperor William II 
German Emperor William II stayed at the hotel at the outbreak of World War I and received the news there.  The hotel still possesses the chair he used on that occasion in their restaurant.

References

External links 

 The hotel's official website

Sogndal
Art Nouveau hotels
Hotels established in 1913
Hotel buildings completed in 1913
Hotels in Vestland
1913 establishments in Norway
Swiss chalet architecture